Police Public is a  1990 Indian Hindi-language crime thriller film, directed by Esmayeel Shroff. The film stars Raaj Kumar, Raj Kiran, Poonam Dhillon, Naseeruddin Shah, Kabir Bedi and Prem Chopra. The film is a remake of the Malayalam film Oru CBI Diary Kurippu.

Cast
 Raaj Kumar as CBI Officer Jagmohan Azaad
 Naseeruddin Shah as Senior Inspector Mahasingh Garewal
 Kabir Bedi as Senior Inspector Shah Nawaz Khan
 Raj Kiran as Arun Sharma
 Poonam Dhillon as Karuna Sharma
 Shikha Swaroop as Usha Swaroop - Karuna Sharma's sister
 Arbaaz Ali Khan as Shyam - Usha Swaroop's boyfriend  
 Prem Chopra as Kishan Sharma 
 Ajit Vachani as Ram Narayan Tiwari 
 Harish Patel as Jagmohan's Assistant
 Rakesh Bedi as Lallulal
 Ila Arun as Laxmi
 A. K. Hangal as Ram Swaroop

This is a remake of a Malayalam movie Oru CBI Diary Kurippu, which released in 1988.
Raaj Kumar's performance as a CBI officer was praised by the critics.

Soundtrack
The film's music was composed by Raamlaxman. Lyrics were by the late Asad Bhopali.
 "Main Jis Din Bhula Doon Tera Pyar Dil Se" was very popular song

References

External links 
 

1990s Hindi-language films
1990 films
Films scored by Raamlaxman
Central Bureau of Investigation in fiction
Hindi remakes of Malayalam films